René Remangeon (16 November 1931 – 23 March 2019) was a French racing cyclist. He rode in the 1954 Tour de France.

References

1931 births
2019 deaths
French male cyclists
Place of birth missing